"Wrapping Paper" is a song by the British rock group The Cream. Bassist and singer Jack Bruce composed the music, with lyrics by Pete Brown. In 1966, Reaction Records released the song on their debut single, with "Cat's Squirrel" as the B-side. It reached number 34 on the UK Singles Chart in 1966.  The song was later included on the compilation albums Superstarshine Vol. 6 / Cream (1972), The Very Best of Cream (1995) and Those Were the Days (1997).

Background
In contrast with the hard blues rock of other early Cream songs such as "N.S.U." and the psychedelic pop-style of "I Feel Free," it has a distinctive slow-jazzy style. The song reflects the band's iconoclastic persona, their desire to confuse their audience, their interest in the absurdist art movement of the time, and refusal to fit into accepted and orthodox musical styles and categories.

The lyrics to "Wrapping Paper" talk about a man who lost his love and finds himself constantly looking at a picture of himself and his love and keeps wishing to go back "to the house on the shore." The song's lyrics share common similarities with the songs "Dreaming" and "The Coffee Song".

Personnel
Jack Brucelead vocals, bass guitar, piano, cello
Eric Claptonbacking vocals, guitar
Ginger Bakerdrums, percussion

Charts

References

1966 debut singles
Cream (band) songs
Songs written by Jack Bruce
Reaction Records singles
1966 songs
Rhythm and blues songs
Songs with lyrics by Pete Brown